La 167 is the seventh studio album, and eighth overall including the compilation album En Letra de Otro (2019), by Puerto Rican singer Farruko, released on October 1, 2021, through Sony Music Latin. It was produced by Sharo Towers, Prida Beats, Eze el Ezeta, K45, Ghetto, IAmChino, Víctor Cárdenas, Dímelo Flow, Izaak, Jvy Boy, K LO K, Elektrikbeat, Iverson, Maya, JC Karo, Jhon El Diver, Noize, BK, Juan Alfredo Díaz, Carlos Humberto Domínguez, J. Cross, Joniel, Zimmi, Jhonny Leandro Cardona, Vladislav Yurivich Polyakov, Mauro Silvino Bertrán, Jordan Mcclure, David Hayle, Alejandro Armes and Nelson Díaz Martínez.

The album features collaborations with Oneill, Daniel Habif, Jay Wheeler, Dímelo Flow, DJ Adoni, Ñengo Flow, Víctor Cardenas, White Star, J. Cross, Pedro Capó, Gallego, Yomo, Brray, Noriel, Luar La L, Freny Franklin, Lenier, Mavado, India Martínez, Lito MC Cassidy, Myke Towers, Tempo, Secreto "El Famoso Biberón" and Pacho El Antifeka.

At the 22nd Annual Latin Grammy Awards, the song "La Tóxica" was nominated for Best Reggaeton Performance. The album topped the Top Latin Albums chart, being Farruko's fourth number one in the chart, and peaked at number 26 at the Billboard 200 chart, being his highest entry in the chart. It was certified platinum in United States.

Background
The name of the album comes from a highway close to were Farruko grew up in Bayamón, Puerto Rico. On that highway, his grandfather owned a gas station, which is referenced on the cover art for the album. Farruko said that "the 167 is where I grew up, it was the first road that my eyes saw, that touched my legs, there are paths and spaces that mark your life and 167 marked my life". Throughout the album, various influential Latin American singers are referenced like salsa singers Ismael Rivera, who is mentioned in "El Incomprendido", and Hector Lavoe, whose song "Juanito Alimaña" appears in "Pepas", and Mexican singer Paquita la del Barrio, whose song "Rata de dos pasas" is sampled in "Cucaracha". The album also makes nods to Latin American culture like in "Jíbaro", which takes its name from the Puerto Rican slang used to refer to countryside people, and "Baja Cali", named after the Mexican state of Baja California, which includes Mexican slang in its lyrics. Soundwise, the album experiments with a variety of musical genres such as trap in "Ki" and "Cucaracha", EDM in "Embalao" and "El Incomprendido", dancehall in "W.F.M.", reggae in "Jíbaro", regional mexican music in the corrido-influenced "Baja Cali" and guaracha in "Pepas".

Following the release of the album, Farruko has said that he has considered the possibility of retiring from music, he said that "I started when I was 15 years old and I am already 30 years old, I don't want to have a forced retirement at 40 or 50, I want to leave earlier and leave at my best". To promote the album, Farruko embarked on the La 167 Tour, which spanned through several cities in United States and Puerto Rico, starting in November 2021 and culminating in February 2022 in Chicago.

Singles
The first single for the album was "La Tóxica", released on July 24, 2020. The song peaked at number four on the Hot Latin Songs chart. A remix for the song was later released on October 23, 2020, featuring Jay Wheeler, Myke Towers, Sech and Tempo. The second single was "Pepas", released on June 24, 2021, which topped the Hot Latin Songs and Dance/Electronic Songs charts, being Farruko's first number-one song on both charts. It also peaked at number 25 on the Billboard 100 chart, being his highest appearance in the chart. Additionally, the song charted in several countries in Latin America and Europe such as Honduras, Nicaragua, Paraguay, Peru, Spain and Switzerland. The third single was "El Incomprendido", released on October 1, 2021. All three singles were certified platinum in both Spain and United States, with "Pepas" selling over two million copies in the latter country.

Track listing

Sample credits
  "El Incomprendido" interpolates "Better Off Alone", written by Sebastiaan Molijn and Eelke Kahlberg, performed by Alice Deejay.

Credits

Musicians
 
 Farruko – lead artist, composition (all tracks)
 Oneill – vocals (track 1), composition (tracks 1-2, 14, 22)
 Daniel Habif – vocals (track 1)
 Jay Wheeler – vocals, composition (track 4)
 Dímelo Flow – vocals (track 5)
 DJ Adoni – vocals (track 5, 12)
 Ñengo Flow – vocals, composition (track 6)
 Abraham Elías Dubarrán – guitar (track 11)
 Victor Cardenas – vocals (track 12)
 White Star – vocals (track 13)
 J. Cross – vocals (track 13)
 Pedro Capó – vocals, composition (track 14)
 Gallego – vocals, composition (track 16)
 Yomo – vocals, composition (track 17)
 Brray – vocals, composition (track 18)
 Noriel – vocals, composition (track 18)
 Luar La L – vocals, composition (track 19)
 Sebastian Graux – guitar (track 19)
 Fresy Franklin – vocals (track 20)
 Lenier – vocals (track 21)
 Adrian Gutierrez – keyboards (track 21)
 Mavado – vocals, composition (track 22)
 India Martinez – vocals, composition (track 23)
 Lito MC Cassidy – vocals, composition (track 23)
 Myke Towers – vocals, composition (track 24)
 Tempo – vocals, composition (track 24)
 Secreto "El Famoso Biberón" – vocals, composition (track 24)
 Pacho El Antifeka – vocals, composition (track 24)

Technical
 
 Sharo Towers – production (tracks 1-7, 11-15, 17, 23-25), mixing (all tracks), performance arranging (tracks 1-2, 4-17, 18, 20, 23-25), recording engineering (tracks 1-15, 17-18, 20, 23-24), executive production (tracks 2-25), composition (tracks 1-17, 19-21, 23-25)
 Prida Beats – production (tracks 1, 6, 11, 16, 23), composition (tracks 1, 6, 11, 16, 23-24), performance arranging (tracks 23-24), mixing (track 23)
 Eze el Ezeta – production (tracks 1, 6, 11, 16, 23), composition (tracks 1, 6, 11, 16, 23), performance arranging (track 23)
 Ghetto – production (tracks 2-3, 7, 11, 14-15, 19, 24), performance arranging (tracks 1-2, 4, 7-11, 14-16, 18-19, 24), composition (tracks 2-4, 7-11, 15-16, 19, 21, 24), recording engineering (tracks 4, 7-9, 13-14, 16, 21), mixing (track 18)
 K4G – production (tracks 2-3, 7, 11, 14-15), performance arranging (tracks 1-2, 4, 6-11, 14-16, 18), composition (tracks 2-4, 7, 9-11, 14-16, 21, 24), mixing (track 18)
 IAmChino – production (tracks 3, 12, 21), composition (tracks 3, 12, 21)
 Víctor Cárdenas – production (tracks 3, 12), composition (tracks 3, 12)
 Dímelo Flow – production (tracks 5, 10), performance arranging (track 5), recording engineering (track 5), composition (tracks 5, 10)
 Izaak – production (track 5), performance arranging (track 5), composition (tracks 5, 10)
 Jvy Boy – production (track 5), performance arranging (track 5), composition (track 5)
 K LO K – production (tracks 7, 11, 14, 19, 24), mixing (tracks 1, 4-22, 24, 25), performance arranging (tracks 1, 4, 6-9, 11, 14, 16, 19, 24, 25), composition (tracks 4, 7, 14, 16, 19, 22), recording engineering (tracks 6, 11, 19, 25)
 Elektrikbeat – production, composition (track 8)
 Iverson – production, composition (track 8)
 Maya – production, composition (track 8)
 JC Karo – production, composition (track 9)
 Jhon El Diver – production, composition (track 10)
 Noize – production, composition (track 10)
 BK – production, composition (track 10)
 J. Cross – production (tracks 13, 15), composition (tracks 11, 13, 15), performance arranging (tracks 13-14), recording engineering (track 13)
 Joniel – production, composition (track 18)
 Zimmi – production, composition (track 18)
 Jhonny Leandro Cardona – production, composition (track 20)
 Vladislav Yurivich Polyakov – production, composition (track 20)
 Mauro Silvino Bertrán – production, performance arranging, composition, recording engineering (track 21)
 Jordan McClure – production, composition, performance arranging, recording engeenering (track 22)
 David Hayle – production, composition, performance arranging, recording engeenering (track 22)
 Alejandro Armes – production, composition (track 25)
 Nelson Díaz Martínez – production, composition (track 25)
 Franklin Jovani Martinez – composition (all tracks)
 Andy "White Star" Bauza – composition (tracks 1-19, 22, 24-25), recording engineering (tracks 3, 10), performance arranging (track 6)
 Sly Dunbar – composition (track 2)
 Lloyd Willis – composition (track 2)
 Joselly Rosario – composition (track 2)
 Héctor L. Pagán – composition (track 2)
 David Sánchez Badillo – composition (track 2)
 Juan Manuel Gómez – composition (track 3)
 José Carlos García – composition (track 3)
 Abner Joel Hernández – composition (tracks 4, 7, 10, 14, 16, 19, 22)
 Ramses Iván Herrera Soto – composition (track 5)
 Edwin Rosa Vázquez – composition (track 6)
 Norberto Eduardo Toscano – composition (track 6)
 Robert Kelly – composition (track 7)
 Jeffrey Atkins – composition (track 7)
 Irving Lorenzo – composition (track 7)
 Kendred T. Smith – composition (track 7)
 Luis A. Bermúdez – composition (track 8)
 Juan Alfredo Díaz – composition (track 12)
 Carlos Humberto Domínguez – composition (track 12)
 Johnny Gaitan, Jr. – composition (track 12)
 Juan Manuel Gómez – composition (track 12)
 John P. Ramos Rivera – composition (track 12)
 Eelke A. Kalberg – composition (track 12)
 Sebastiaan Molijn – composition (track 12)
 Félix Manuel Rodriguez – composition (track 12)
 Jesús Manuel Benítez Hiraldo – composition (track 15)
 Tite Curet Alonso – composition (track 16)
 Víctor Manuel Mercado Cruz – composition (track 17)
 Jesús Manuel Benítez Hiraldo – composition (track 17)
 Héctor Luis Delgado – composition (track 17)
 Arnaldo Santos Perez – composition (track 17)
 Kenneth Alejandro Vargas Pérez – composition (track 18)
 Eric Omar Rosario Ferrer – composition (track 20)
 Albaro Mesa – composition (track 21)
 Michael Calderon – composition (track 21)
 Alejandro Lima – composition (track 21)
 George Noriega – vocal production (track 14)
 Michael Fuller – mastering (all tracks)
 Franklin Martínez – executive producer (all tracks)

Charts

Weekly charts

Year-end charts

Certifications

References

2021 albums
Farruko albums